Stanislav Zvolenský (born November 19, 1958) is a Slovak prelate of the Roman Catholic Church. He is the first Archbishop of Bratislava.

Biography
Stanislav Zvolenský was born in Trnava, and was ordained to the priesthood by Bishop Julius Gábriš on June 13, 1982.

On April 2, 2004, he was appointed Auxiliary Bishop of Bratislava-Trnava and Titular Bishop of Nova Sinna by Pope John Paul II. Zvolenský received his episcopal consecration on the following May 2 from Archbishop Ján Sokol, with Archbishop Henryk Józef Nowacki and Bishop Dominik Tóth serving as co-consecrators.

He was later named the first Archbishop of Bratislava by Pope Benedict XVI on February 14, 2008, whence the archdiocese was split into that of Bratislava and of Trnava. Zvolenský was installed as Archbishop on March 8. He is the chairman of Slovak Bishop's Conference since 28 October 2009. He served in this position for four consecutive four-year terms until he was replaced on 103rd Plenary Session of the Conference by Metropolitan Archbishop Bernard Bober.

External links

Catholic-Hierarchy

1958 births
Living people
People from Trnava
21st-century Roman Catholic archbishops in Slovakia